United Nations Convention may refer to:
Organizations, mainly in economic and social fields and for the promotion of human rights, that are set up by the United Nations Economic and Social Council under the authority of Article 68 of the United Nations Charter. These include the following:
United Nations Convention on the Rights of the Child
United Nations Convention on the Law of the Sea
United Nations Convention against Torture
United Nations Convention on Contracts for the International Sale of Goods
United Nations Convention against Corruption
United Nations Convention Against Illicit Traffic in Narcotic Drugs and Psychotropic Substances
United Nations Convention against Transnational Organized Crime
United Nations Convention on Environmental Modification
Some United Nations General Assembly resolutions, such as:
Universal Declaration of Human Rights
United Nations Convention on Environmental Modification
Convention on the Prevention and Punishment of the Crime of Genocide